Thread of the Silkworm is a 1996 historical nonfiction book by Iris Chang. It tells the story of Qian Xuesen, a leading cyberneticist/aerodynamist who assisted on the Manhattan Project, was deported amidst the Red Scare, and subsequently became a chief progenitor of the Chinese space program.

Heidi Benson of the San Francisco Chronicle stated that "It was well-reviewed, though it never sold in great numbers."

References

1996 non-fiction books
Biographies (books)
Books about the Manhattan Project
Space program of the People's Republic of China